Suleiman Hassan Haddi is a Somali politician. He is the former Mayor of Borama, the capital and the largest city of Awdal region of Somaliland, from 2018 to 2021.

See also

 Mayor of Borama
 Borama

References

Living people
People from Awdal
Mayors of places in Somaliland
Somaliland politicians
Year of birth missing (living people)